Harry Warburton (April 10, 1921 – May 1, 2005) was a Swiss bobsledder who competed in the mid-1950s. He won the bronze in the two-man event at the 1956 Winter Olympics in Cortina d'Ampezzo.

Warburton also won three medals at the FIBT World Championships with two golds (Two-man: 1955, Four-man: 1954) and one silver (Four-man: 1955).

References

Bobsleigh two-man Olympic medalists 1932-56 and since 1964
Bobsleigh two-man world championship medalists since 1931
Bobsleigh four-man world championship medalists since 1930

External links
 
 

1921 births
2005 deaths
Bobsledders at the 1956 Winter Olympics
Swiss male bobsledders
Olympic medalists in bobsleigh
Medalists at the 1956 Winter Olympics
Olympic bronze medalists for Switzerland
Olympic bobsledders of Switzerland
20th-century Swiss people